Jon Aingeru González Díez (born 31 December 1973) is a Spanish retired footballer who played as a forward, and a current coach.

Playing career
Born in Sestao, Basque Country, González was known as Peli during his playing days. An Athletic Bilbao youth graduate, he moved to Segunda División side Sestao Sport Club in 1972, and made his maiden appearance in the category on 12 June 1973 by coming on as a late substitute in a 1–2 home loss against Mérida UD.

Subsequently, until his retirement, he always competed in the lower leagues, representing CA Osasuna B, SCD Durango, Zalla UC and SD San Pedro. His best personal input consisted of six goals and 27 appearances during the 1995–96 campaign.

Managerial career
After starting his career with the youth sides of Union Sport San Vicente and Santutxu FC, González coached Peña Athletic de Santurtzi CF, Sporting Club de Lutxana, SD Indautxu and SD Retuerto Sport, achieving promotion to Tercera División with the latter in 2013.

On 13 November 2015 González joined Sestao River Club as Txus Pinedo's assistant. The following 24 May, he renewed his contract and subsequently became the club's first team manager.

References

External links

1973 births
Living people
People from Sestao
Spanish footballers
Footballers from the Basque Country (autonomous community)
Association football forwards
Segunda División players
Segunda División B players
Tercera División players
Sestao Sport Club footballers
CA Osasuna B players
Spanish football managers
Sestao River managers
Sportspeople from Biscay